Daniel Gordon Bonar (born September 23, 1956) is a Canadian retired professional ice hockey forward who played 170 games in the National Hockey League for the Los Angeles Kings. During the playoff series known for the Miracle on Manchester Bonar scored the final two goals of game 5 to ice the series over the Wayne Gretzky-led Edmonton Oilers, completing one of the greatest upsets in playoff hockey history.

Bonar was born in Deloraine, Manitoba.

Career statistics

Awards and achievements
Turnbull Cup (MJHL) Championship (1973)
Centennial Cup Championship (1973)
IHL Rookie of the Year (1978)
IHL First All-Star Team (1978)
IHL MVP (1978)

External links

1956 births
Living people
Canadian ice hockey centres
Los Angeles Kings players
Ice hockey people from Manitoba
Portage Terriers players
People from Deloraine, Manitoba
Brandon Wheat Kings players
Undrafted National Hockey League players